Shadrikha is a river in Novosibirsky and Iskitimsky districts of Novosibirsk Oblast. The river flows into the Berd Bay. Its length is 17 km (11 mi).

Tourism 
From 12 to 14 July 2019, a historical reconstruction took place near the mouth of the river. Residents of Novosibirsk, Tomsk and Zheleznogorsk reconstructed the atmosphere of the Caribbean archipelago of the early 17th century.

References

External links
 Государственный водный реестр: река Шадриха. State Water Register: Shadrikha River.

Rivers of Novosibirsk Oblast